Flatlander may refer to:

 "Flatlander" (short story), a 1967 story by Larry Niven
 Flatlander (short story collection), a 1975 collection of short stories by Larry Niven
 Flatlander (Niven), a term used in Larry Niven's works
 A character in the 1884 Edwin Abbott novella Flatland
 The Flatlanders, a country music band
 Andy Morin, audio engineer for the hip hop group Death Grips, often referred to as "Flatlander".
 Flatlander, a term for newcomers to the U.S. states of Maine, New Hampshire, or Vermont 
 Flatlander, anyone originating from Umina, Central Coast of NSW, Australia.

See also
 Flatland (disambiguation)
 Flat (disambiguation)
 Lander (disambiguation)

de:Flatlanders